Gypsonoma distincta is a species of moth of the family Tortricidae. It is found in China (Sichuan, Shaanxi, Gansu).

References

Moths described in 1971
Eucosmini